Grypodon is an extinct genus of prehistoric ray-finned fish that lived during the Late Cretaceous epoch.

See also

 Prehistoric fish
 List of prehistoric bony fish

References

Late Cretaceous fish
Pycnodontiformes genera